Lypusidae is an obscure family of moths placed in the superfamily Gelechioidea.

History of classification
The group was traditionally considered monotypic (containing only the genus Lypusa with two species) and belonging in the primitive moth superfamily Tineoidea. Previous research suggested that Lypusa was so closely related to Amphisbatis – the type genus of the gelechioid subfamily Amphisbatinae (or family Amphisbatidae) – that these groups were merged.

Taxonomy and systematics
Lypusinae Herrich-Schäffer, 1857
Chimabachinae Heinemann, 1870

References

 
Moth families